The Waipunga River is a tributary of the Mohaka River, located between Taupo and Napier in New Zealand's North Island. It runs roughly 50 km from its source near the eastern edge of the Volcanic Plateau to its junction with the Mohaka, of which some 15 km follow alongside the Napier-Taupo highway (State Highway 5).

The scenic Waipunga Falls are visible from a rest stop along the highway.

Rivers of the Hawke's Bay Region
Rivers of New Zealand